The 1927 season was Wisła Krakóws 19th year as a club.

Friendlies

Ekstraklasa

Squad, appearances and goals

|-
|}

Goalscorers

External links
1927 Wisła Kraków season at historiawisly.pl

Wisła Kraków seasons
Association football clubs 1927 season
Wisla